The Little Khural (Baga Khural) or State Little Khural (Ulsyn Baga Khural) was the presidium of the Mongolian People's Republic from 1924 until 1951 and then the standing legislature from 1990 to 1992.

The original Little Khural of 1924 comprised five members elected by the State Great Khural (Улсын Их Хурал, Ulsyn Ikh Khural). The chairman of the Little Khural was in effect head of state and the Little Khural elected the prime minister. The first session of the Little Khural began on 29 November 1924. It originally met two to three times a year, but in the 1930s this rate dwindled to once every two or three years. After 1927 it had only three members. Towards the end of World War II, in solidarity with the Soviet Union, the Little Khural declared war against the Empire of Japan on 10 August 1945. The Little Khural held its 32nd and last session in February 1950. In 1951 Mongolia amended its constitution and abolished the Little Khural.

In 1960 a new constitution was adopted, and during the Revolution of 1990 it was amended to create a standing legislative body out of the existing People's Great Khural (Ардын Их Хурал, Ardyn Ikh Khural). This new Little Khural was to consist of 50 representatives selected by the Great Khural. Three-quarters of these members had to be chosen from among the members of the Great Khural. The seats in the Little Khural were apportioned amongst those parties participating in the elections by proportional representation. The new khural met twice annually in 75-day sessions. It had a chairman, Radnaasümbereliyn Gonchigdorj, who was also ex officio vice president; a vice chairman, Kinayatyn Zardyhan; and a secretary, Byaraagiyn Chimid. It held its first session in September 1990 and was abolished in July 1992 by the adoption of a new Constitution of Mongolia, which created a unicameral legislature.

Notes

Mongolian People's Republic
1924 establishments in Mongolia
1990 establishments in Mongolia
Defunct unicameral legislatures
Defunct national legislatures